Leslie Hore-Belisha, 1st Baron Hore-Belisha, PC (Isaac Leslie Belisha; 7 September 1893 – 16 February 1957) was a British Liberal, then National Liberal Member of Parliament (MP) and Cabinet Minister. He later joined the Conservative Party. He proved highly successful in modernizing the British road system in 1934–1937 as Minister of Transport. As War Secretary, 1937–1940, he feuded with the commanding generals and was removed in 1940. Some writers believe anti-semitism played a role in both his dismissal and in blocking his appointment as Minister of Information.
One historian compares his strong and weak points:

His name is still widely associated in the UK with the introduction of flashing amber "Belisha beacons" at pedestrian crossings while he was Minister for Transport.

Background and education 
Hore-Belisha was born Isaac Leslie Belisha in Hampstead, London on 7 September 1893. He was the only son of the Jewish family of Jacob Isaac Belisha and his wife, Elizabeth Miriam Miens. 
His father died when he was less than one year old. In 1912 his widowed mother married Adair Hore, Permanent Secretary of the Ministry of Pensions. Leslie Belisha then adopted the double-barrelled surname.

Hore-Belisha was educated at Clifton College where he was in Polack's house. He continued his studies in Paris and Heidelberg, before attending St John's College, Oxford, where he was President of the Oxford Union Society. While in Heidelberg, he became a member of Burschenschaft  in 1912. During the First World War he joined the British Army and served in France, Flanders and Salonika and finished the war with the rank of major in the Army Service Corps. After the war, after leaving the army, he returned to Oxford and, in 1923, qualified as a barrister.

Political career 

At the 1922 general election, Hore-Belisha was an unsuccessful candidate for the Liberal Party in the Plymouth Devonport constituency. However, thanks to his new political agent, Benjamin Musgrave, he won the seat at the general election the following year, and became known in Parliament as a flamboyant and brilliant speaker. 

He generally allied himself with right-wing Liberals critical of their party's support for the Labour minority governments, joining with Sir John Simon in becoming a 'Liberal National' upon the formation of the National Government in 1931. After the 1931 general election, Hore-Belisha was appointed a junior minister at the Board of Trade.

He remained in government when the official Liberals withdrew in September 1932 over the issue of free trade, and was promoted to Financial Secretary to the Treasury. Hore-Belisha showed considerable intelligence and drive in government, although his intense energy tended to alienate traditionalist elements who resented his status as an "outsider".

Transport minister, 1934–1937 
Hore-Belisha was appointed Minister of Transport in 1934 coming to public prominence at a time when motoring was becoming available to the masses. All speed limits for motor cars had controversially been removed by the Road Traffic Act 1930 during the previous administration. There was, in 1934, a record number of road casualties in the UK, with 7,343 deaths and 231,603 injuries being recorded, with half of the casualties being pedestrians and three-quarters occurring in built-up areas. 

Shortly after being appointed, he was crossing Camden High Street when a sports car shot along the street without stopping, nearly causing him "serious injury or worse". He became involved in a public-relations exercise to demonstrate how to use the new "uncontrolled crossings".

Hore-Belisha's Road Traffic Act 1934 introduced a speed limit of 30 mph for motor cars in built-up areas. The new act was vigorously opposed by many, who saw the new regulations as a removal of "an Englishman's freedom of the highway". The earlier 20 mph speed limit had been abolished in 1930 because it was universally flouted. A large backlog of court cases had made the law unenforceable. In addition, The Automobile Association (AA) and the Royal Automobile Club (RAC) had frequently been successful in defending their members against evidence from primitive speed traps.

Hore-Belisha rewrote the Highway Code and was responsible for the introduction of two innovations that led to a dramatic drop in the number of road accidents: the driving test and the Belisha beacon, named after him by the public. On his retirement, he was made vice-president of the Pedestrians' Association and, the organisation adopted a logo (since replaced) of a walking zebra crossing with Belisha Beacon.

Secretary of State for War, 1937–1940 
His success at the Ministry of Transport, in 1937, led to an appointment by Neville Chamberlain as Secretary of State for War replacing the popular Alfred Duff Cooper, who later resigned from the government over Chamberlain's policy of appeasement. There were voices within the Conservative majority that such a high-profile appointment should not have gone to a Liberal National, and Hore-Belisha's Conservative colleagues labelled him a warmonger. Many took to nicknaming him "Horeb-Elisha" or "Horeb" as an anti-semitic pun on his race. (Horeb is mentioned in the Hebrew Bible as the place where the golden calf was made and to which Elijah fled.)

Upon appointing Hore-Belisha as Secretary of State, Chamberlain advised him to read B. H. Liddell Hart's book Europe in Arms, which advocated that Britain should avoid becoming involved in a continental land war and rely on the Royal Air Force as its offensive arm. 

Impressed by the book's arguments and under Cabinet pressure to control expenditure, Hore-Belisha formed a close partnership with Liddell Hart and sought to refocus the British Army away from the aim of raising a second British Expeditionary Force to fight in France.

Unhappy with the Army Council's opposition to his policies, Hore-Belisha sacked Field Marshal Cyril Deverell, the Chief of the Imperial General Staff, along with the Adjutant General and Master-General of the Ordnance in December 1937. Guided by Liddell Hart, he interviewed John Dill and Archibald Wavell before finally settling on Lord Gort, a relatively junior general, as Deverell's replacement. The new team at the head of the British Army was not a success. Gort was no more enthusiastic about Hore-Belisha's course of action than Deverell had been and objected to Liddell Hart's continued influence. For his part by March 1939, Hore-Belisha would declare that "Gort has no brain at all".

The Munich Crisis shook Hore-Belisha's confidence that Britain would be able to avoid full-scale commitment to a continental war. In December 1938, a group of junior Conservative ministers including the Under-Secretary for War, Lord Strathcona, demanded that Chamberlain remove Hore-Belisha. The Prime Minister refused and Strathcona was sacked, but the event demonstrated Hore-Belisha's political isolation. However, in February, he secured a major increase in budget to re-equip the British Army for continental operations. In his speech to Parliament during the March Budget Estimate, Hore-Belisha acknowledged this was a reversal of his previous policy, but still won plaudits for his plans.

Any hope of reconciliation with his military subordinates was ruined when, at a Cabinet meeting on 28 March, Hore-Belisha recommended doubling the size of the Territorial Army to demonstrate Britain's resolve. This was announced in Parliament the next day, to the consternation of the Army Council who had not been consulted about the decision. Lord Gort, who was in France, reputedly learned of it from a newspaper. The Army was already badly short of equipment and raising the new Territorial Divisions would require transferring soldiers from the front line units.

In May, Hore-Belisha succeeded in passing the Military Training Act, the first peacetime conscription law in the United Kingdom. The Act provided for six months of full-time military training, after which men would enter the Reserve. The first cohort began their training in June. Following the outbreak of war in September it was replaced by the National Service Act.

Dismissal 

In January 1940, Prime Minister Chamberlain dismissed Hore-Belisha from the War Office. He had been in an increasingly untenable position due to his disputes with the Army high command and the King and hostility from sympathisers within the public of the British Union of Fascists after Oswald Mosley claimed him to be a "Jewish warmonger". By 1940, his relations with Lord Gort, commander of the British Expeditionary Force (BEF) in France, had deteriorated such that neither man had confidence in the other. Gort and other generals disliked Hore-Belisha's showmanship, but their main disagreements had stemmed from the Pillbox affair, concerning the defence of France along the border with Belgium. Hore-Belisha was unpopular amongst his fellow ministers, with meetings of the War Cabinet said to be regularly tense and loud. As a result, Chamberlain agreed to replace him as Secretary of State for War.

Military anti-semitism contributed to tensions between Hore-Belisha and Gort, with Henry Pownall, the chief of staff to the BEF in France and Belgium until the fall of France in May 1940, claiming in his diary that "the ultimate fact is that they could never get on – you couldn't expect two such utterly different people to do so – a great gentleman and an obscure, shallow-brained, charlatan, political Jewboy".

Initially, the Prime Minister considered Hore-Belisha for the post of Minister of Information, but decided against this when the Foreign Office raised concerns about the effect of having a Jewish politician in this position given the undercurrent of anti-semitism in some sections of the public. Instead, Chamberlain offered him the post of Presidency of the Board of Trade. Hore-Belisha refused this demotion and resigned from the government.

Due to the sensitive nature of the disagreements, many MPs and political commentators were bewildered as to why the dismissal had taken place, and Hore-Belisha's formal statement to the Commons left them little wiser. A common belief was that Hore-Belisha's bold reforms at the War Office had been opposed by the established military commanders, often caricatured as Colonel Blimps, and that they had forced his resignation. Colin Brown wrote that Hore-Belisha's dismissal was "possibly fuelled by a desire to placate Hitler [by removing a Jew from the Cabinet] even once war had been declared", or even due to pressure by George VI upon Chamberlain because of Hore-Belisha's previous support for Edward VIII during the abdication crisis, although the offer of alternative office and Hore-Belisha's original appointment argue against this latter motive. Harry Defries argues that anti-semitism was the root cause of the dismissal.

Subsequent political career 
Hore-Belisha attempted to rebuild his career under the wartime premiership of Winston Churchill (1940–1945), but his re-appointment was blocked by a combination of his wounded intransigence and continued Conservative prejudice. He resigned from the National Liberals in 1942, sitting as a "National Independent" MP. In the Conservative "caretaker" government of 1945, he was briefly appointed Minister for National Insurance. At the 1945 general election, Hore-Belisha, still standing as a National Independent, was defeated in Devonport by the Labour candidate, Michael Foot. He, thereupon, peremptorily dismissed Musgrave, his faithful political agent, and joined the Conservative Party. In 1947, he was elected to Westminster City Council. He fought unsuccessfully in the Coventry South constituency at the 1950 general election. In 1954, he was elevated to the peerage as Baron Hore-Belisha, of Devonport in the County of Devon.

Personal life 
In 1944, at 51, he married Cynthia Elliot, who was a relative of the Earl of Minto. They had no children.

While leading a British parliamentary delegation to France in February 1957, he collapsed while making a speech at Reims town hall, and died a few minutes later. The cause of death was given as a cerebral haemorrhage. The barony died with him as he had no children. Lady Hore-Belisha died in July 1991, aged 75.

Fictional role 
H. G. Wells in The Shape of Things to Come, published in 1934, predicted a Second World War in which Britain would not participate but would vainly try to effect a peaceful compromise. In this vision, Hore-Belisha was mentioned as one of several prominent Britons delivering "brilliant pacific speeches" which "echo throughout Europe" but fail to end the war. The other would-be peacemakers, in Wells' vision, included Duff Cooper, Ellen Wilkinson and Randolph Churchill.

Further reading 
 Grimwood, Ian R. A Little Chit of a Fellow (Book Guild, 2006)
 Harris, J. P. "Two War Ministers: A Reassessment of Duff Cooper and Hore-Belisha". War and Society 6#1: May 1988
 Christopher Hollis, Oxford in the Twenties (1976)

Primary sources 
 R. J. Minney, ed. The Private Papers of Hore-Belisha (Collins, 1960)
 War Diaries 1939–1945 Field Marshal Lord Alanbrooke edited by Alex Danchev and Daniel Todman (University of California Press, 1957, 1959, 2001)

References

External links 

 
 
The Papers of Leslie Hore-Belisha held at Churchill Archives Centre

1893 births
1957 deaths
Alumni of St John's College, Oxford
20th-century British Jews
English people of Moroccan descent
British people of World War II
British Secretaries of State
Councillors in Greater London
Jewish British politicians
Liberal Party (UK) MPs for English constituencies
Members of the Privy Council of the United Kingdom
People from Devonport, Plymouth
Presidents of the Oxford Union
UK MPs 1923–1924
UK MPs 1924–1929
UK MPs 1929–1931
UK MPs 1931–1935
UK MPs 1935–1945
UK MPs who were granted peerages
People educated at Clifton College
Conservative Party (UK) hereditary peers
Burials at Golders Green Jewish Cemetery
War Office personnel in World War II
Parliamentary Secretaries to the Board of Trade
National Liberal Party (UK, 1931) politicians
British Army personnel of World War I
Royal Army Service Corps officers
Secretaries of State for Transport (UK)
Ministers in the Churchill caretaker government, 1945
Ministers in the Chamberlain wartime government, 1939–1940
Ministers in the Chamberlain peacetime government, 1937–1939
Hereditary barons created by Elizabeth II
Military personnel from London